Bad Mood Guy is the seventh studio album by the Australian experimental group Severed Heads, first released in 1987. Upon its initial release, the album met positive reviews with critics, one in particular referring to it as "punishing pop with crunching rhythms". The album's lead single "Hot With Fleas" did well on independent radio stations, peaking at #4 on Rockpool's dance charts during the week of 31 December 1987.  In 2002, after an attempt at making a version 2 of the album which was aborted due to the master DAT tape being irreparably damaged, Tom Ellard made a new version available on CD-R on his SevCom label, which substituted demo and live versions of some tracks and added extra material.  This version (with some album versions of songs restored as bonus tracks) is what Tom made available on the official Severed Heads Bandcamp page.

Track listing (original 1987 release)

Track listing (2002 SevCom reissue)

2:  Edited version of the B-side of the "Hot with Fleas" 12" single.
3:  From the compilation album Nettwerk Sound Sampler:  Food for Thought.
9:  Edited version of the B-side of the "Greater Reward" 12" single.
16-18:  Added to the Bandcamp release.

Personnel
Tom Ellard - vocals, programming, mixing
Robert Racic - editing, mixing
Steven R. Gilmore - artwork, design
Andrew Penhallow - assistant mixing
Nick Mainbridge - assistant mixing

Release history

References

External links
 
 Bad Mood Guy at Bandcamp

Severed Heads albums
1987 albums